Kotapadu is a village in Krishna district of the Indian state of Andhra Pradesh. It is located in Chatrai mandal of Nuzvid revenue division. It falls under the administration of Kotapadu panchayat.

References 

Villages in Krishna district